Juggernaut was an American technical/progressive thrash metal band formed in San Antonio, Texas in 1985.

Biography 
Juggernaut was created in 1985 by former Kamakazi members Scott Womack (bass) and Harlan Glenn (vocals), who were joined by guitarist Robert "Bob dog" Catlin, formerly with S.A. Slayer. Catlin's former S.A. Slayer bandmate Dave McClain, later of Sacred Reich and Machine Head, joined the fold just long enough to record the track "In The Blood of Virgins" for inclusion on Metal Blade Records' Metal Massacre VII compilation in 1986. During that year, the band played many shows, including sold-out shows with King Diamond.

After originally being approached by Dave Richards of Azra/Iron Works Records with plans of releasing an EP, the quartet instead signed a deal with Metal Blade Records and they released two studio albums, Baptism Under Fire (1986) and Trouble Within (1987). Both featured guitarist Eddie Katilius who joined the group two weeks before the recording of Baptism Under Fire. Katilius is also the person wearing the World War II-era gas mask on the cover of Baptism Under Fire.

Frontman Harlan Glenn, aka Harlan Groom, eventually left the group due to 'musical differences' and moved to Los Angeles, where he fronted a couple of different outfits, including Bon Appetit.  His replacement was former Liquid Sky, S.A. Slayer and Narita vocalist Steve Cooper with whom the band recorded the Trouble Within album. Drummer Bobby Jarzombek also ended up leaving in order to join reformed New York City metal outfit Riot, but agreed to record Trouble Within on a session basis. Juggernaut disbanded in 1993 after going through various incarnations in Dallas, Texas, which included Denny Shoup (guitar), Phil Thomas (drums), and John Davis (vocals), with bassist Scott Womack being the only remaining musician from the old San Antonio days.

In 1998, Baptism Under Fire was re-issued on CD, including the band's unreleased Iron Works Records EP as bonus tracks, by German-based High Vaultage Records. Singer Steve Cooper succumbed to kidney failure due to complications of type 1 diabetes on May 14, 2006.

Notes 
Harlan Glenn now works as a director, producer, author, archival supervisor, and technical advisor for outlets such as The History Channel and The Discovery Channel specializing in World War II history. He is also a published author of several WWII history books.

Line-ups

Original recording lineup (1985) 
Harlan Glenn – vocals
Bob Catlin – guitars
Scott Womack – bass
Dave McClain – drums

'Baptism Under Fire' lineup (1986) 
Harlan Glenn – vocals
Eddie Katilius – guitars
Scott Womack – bass
Bobby Jarzombek – drums

'Trouble Within' lineup (1987) 
Steve Cooper – vocals
Eddie Katilius – guitars
Scott Womack – bass
Bobby Jarzombek – drums

Discography

Studio albums 
Baptism Under Fire (1986)
Trouble Within (1987)

Other appearances 
Metal Massacre VII (1986)

References

External links 
 [ Allmusic Biography]
 Juggernaut @ Metal Archives
 Juggernaut @ YouTube
 Steve Cooper obituary @ SA Rocks blog

American thrash metal musical groups
American progressive metal musical groups
Heavy metal musical groups from Texas
Metal Blade Records artists
Musical groups established in 1985
Musical groups disestablished in 1993
Musical quartets
1985 establishments in Texas